Pictura: An Adventure in Art (1951) is a documentary film  directed by seven directors, and narrated by several famous Hollywood actors, including Vincent Price, Gregory Peck, Henry Fonda, Martin Gabel, and Lilli Palmer.

The film attempts to give the general filmgoing public a taste of art history and art appreciation. The film won a Special Award at the Golden Globes in 1952.

List of segments
Prologue: Segment showing Vincent Price talking to art students, directed by E. A. Dupont
Part 1: The Lost Paradise by Hieronymus Bosch (1450-1516). Research and Story, Luciano Emmer, Enrico Gras; Producer, Luciano Emmer; Director, Luciano Emmer; Commentary, King James Version of the Old Testament; Music, Roman Vlad; Played by the Santa Cecilia Academy Rome Orchestra; Narrator, Vincent Price
Part 2: The Legend of St. Ursula by Vittore Carpaccio (1460-1526). Director, Luciano Emmer; Co-Producer, Sergio Amidei; Special Camerawork and Effects, Mario Bava; Screenplay, Richard Nickson; Music, Roman Vlad; Played by the Orchestra of Santa Cecilia Academy in Rome; Conducted by Willy Ferrero; Narrator, Gregory Peck
Part 3: Francisco Goya (1746-1828). Producer, Luciano Emmer; Director, Lauro Venturi; Screenplay, Harry Marble; Music, Isaac Albeniz; Guitar, Andrés Segovia; Narrator, Harry Marble
Part 4: Henri de Toulouse-Lautrec (1863-1901). Directors, Robert Hessens, Olga Lipska; Producer, Pierre Braunberger; Screenplay, Herman Starr; Music, Guy Bernard; Narrator, Lilli Palmer
Part 5: Paul Gauguin (1848-1903). Director, Allan Resnais; Producer, Pierre Braunberger; Research, Gaston Diehl; Music, Darius Milhaud; Narrator, Martin Gabel
Part 6: Grant Wood (1892-1942). Director, Marc Sorkin; Producer, Leonid Kipnis; Research, Jules Schwerin; Camera, John Lewis; Music, Lan Adomian; Musical Direction, Jack Shaindlin; Narrator, Henry Fonda

Tagline
"A strange and exciting voyage."

See also
Vincent Price filmography

References

External links

New York Times review (April 8, 1952)
Entry at Sound of Vincent Price website

1951 films
Documentary films about the visual arts
Films directed by E. A. Dupont
Films directed by Luciano Emmer
Films directed by Alain Resnais
1951 documentary films
American documentary films
American black-and-white films
1950s American films